Three bids to host the 2023 Rugby World Cup (RWC2023) were submitted to World Rugby by the June 2017 deadline, with France selected on 15 November 2017 ahead of Ireland and South Africa. Italy withdrew its bid in September 2016, while Argentina and the United States initially expressed interest but ultimately decided against a formal bid. RWC2023 will be France's first time as sole host, having been principal host in 2007, co-host in 1991, and subsidiary host in 1999.

Schedule
In 2010, it was reported that World Rugby might select the hosts for the 2023 and 2027 at the same time, as they did with the 2015 and 2019 tournaments.  Later this idea was dropped. The bidding schedule was as follows:

The bidding process formally kicked off on 14 May 2015. World Rugby held a meeting with five potential Rugby World Cup 2023 hosts on 6 May 2015 in London that was attended by representatives from Ireland, Italy, South Africa, France and the United States. Apart from the U.S., the countries attending had all previously publicly announced their interest to host the 2023 Rugby World Cup.

On 3 July 2015 World Rugby confirmed interest from the following four nations by the deadline of 15 June 2015:
 France
 Ireland
 Italy (withdrew bid on 28 September 2016)
 South Africa

Confirmed bidders

South Africa

South Africa was considered one of the frontrunners to host the 2023 competition, having hosted the 1995 tournament and bid unsuccessfully for the right to host the 2011, 2015, and 2019 tournaments.

In April 2016 the South African government banned its own rugby union from bidding to stage the 2023 World Cup over its failure to provide enough opportunities for black players. SA Rugby sought urgent talks with sports minister Fikile Mbalula in an effort to get its ban lifted in time for it to bid for the Rugby World Cup 2023. Jurie Roux, the chief executive of SA Rugby stated “There is no question that we have more work to do and we could be moving faster, but our sport has undergone a major overhaul in the past two or three years and we have definitely made great progress.”

South Africa confirmed the bid on 9 May 2017 after the ban was lifted. There are optimistic projections of a R27 billion injection to the local economy by hosting the event, with a focus on eight stadiums across seven cities.

Ireland  
The Irish Government and the Northern Ireland Executive, together with the Irish Rugby Football Union, formally announced on 5 December 2014 their intentions to launch a bid to host the event. Dick Spring, former Tánaiste and Ireland rugby player, and Chair of Ireland's Rugby World Cup 2023 bid, stated in May 2015 that Ireland already had received pledges of support from 40% of World Rugby's board's 27 votes. Ireland's bid included both rugby and Gaelic games grounds. The 82,000 capacity GAA stadium Croke Park would host the final, while other newly redeveloped GAA stadia such as Casement Park, Fitzgerald Stadium, MacHale Park and Páirc Uí Chaoimh would be part of the bid. In July 2017, emergency legislation was passed by the Oireachtas to grant the Minister for Transport, Tourism and Sport the explicit statutory authority to make the financial guarantees which Rugby World Cup Limited required.

On 15 November 2016, 12 stadia were announced as being part of the bid. The provisional list included 's home stadium, Aviva Stadium, the home grounds of Leinster, Munster and Ulster, and eight GAA grounds, with two of these from each province. Some sites, such as Páirc Uí Chaoimh and Casement Park, were then undergoing renovations or expansions. Their planned capacities, as were listed on the IRFU's website, are provided.

France

France, which hosted the 2007 Rugby World Cup, expressed interest in hosting the 2023 tournament.
France launched its bid on 9 February 2017 revealing 19 potential host cities and an environmentally friendly transport plan. On 17 March, 12 host cities were selected. This list was later reduced to 9 cities (excluding Paris, Montpellier and Lens) :

 * To replace with new stadium also before 2024 Summer Olympics

Hosting recommendation and decision
On 31 October 2017, the Rugby World Cup Limited Board submitted a comprehensive evaluation report of the bidders. The report stated that all three countries were capable of hosting the 2023 Rugby World Cup, and recommended South Africa as the preferred host in light of the report's scoring. The evaluation report included a summary of the scoring:	

The biggest differentiating factor among scoring was for venues. South Africa has an ample number of large and modern stadiums by virtue of its hosting the 2010 FIFA World Cup. By contrast, Ireland has not hosted a tournament of similar magnitude, and its stadiums would require significant technology and telecom upgrades to meet RWC requirements.

The evaluation report was met with criticism from French and Irish sources. The President of the French Rugby Federation, Bernard Laporte questioned why France, which had recently hosted the successful UEFA Euro 2016 football tournament, scored lower than South Africa for both stadiums and hotels. Irish media questioned why all three countries received the same score on security; South Africa has the eighth highest murder rate in the world, over 50 times higher than Ireland's rate, while France had suffered numerous terrorist attacks in 2012–17, leading to over 200 deaths. Additionally, the report included limited reference to the fact that Durban, South Africa had initially won the right to host the 2022 Commonwealth Games, before the Commonwealth Games Federation was forced to strip Durban of hosting rights for failure to deliver on key obligations and commitments.

The evaluation report by the Rugby World Cup Limited Board states that French law considers a criminal offence to use, hold or sell drugs. The French bid states that this "would have no impact on RWC 2023 as a tournament, including the participating teams", but it "has not provided any official government documentation to support this statement and therefore this could pose a risk to the tournament and participating teams". According to the report, RWCL "did not specifically request government commitment at this stage".

The World Rugby Council voted on 15 November 2017 to award the 2023 World Cup hosting rights to France. In the first round of voting, no country achieved a majority. Ireland were then eliminated as they gained the fewest votes in the first round. France defeated South Africa in the second round of voting. Council members reportedly preferred the financial superiority of the French bid. According to ESPN, "France's proposal guaranteed a net revenue return of £350 million for World Rugby to invest back into the game; Ireland and South Africa's in turn came in at around £270m." After the vote, IRFU chief executive Philip Browne conceded that last-placed Ireland could not match the other two countries financial offer and stadiums, and questioned whether World Rugby would allow a small country to host the World Cup.

The council voting was as follows:

Declined or withdrew bid

Italy

The Italian Rugby Federation (FIR) confirmed in March 2015 its intention to bid for the 2023 Rugby World Cup. 
On 12 August 2016, the Italian Rugby Federation announced the 12 stadiums they expressed interest in using for the 2023 event.
However, on September 28, 2016, Italy officially withdrew from the competition to host the 2023 Rugby World Cup, after the decision of the Mayor of Rome, Virginia Raggi, to decline the bid of Rome to host the 2024 Summer Olympics.

United States
The United States was anticipated to bid and was considered a possible contender to host the 2023 or 2027 Rugby World Cup. World Rugby CEO Mike Miller stated in 2010 that the United States would host a Rugby World Cup, stating that "it's a question of when, not if." However, on 2023. United States chose as Host Nation for 2031 Rugby World Cup

Argentina
Argentina's World Rugby Council representative Agustín Pichot stated that Argentina wanted to host the 2023 tournament. In May 2016, following a meeting with Pichot, Argentine President Mauricio Macri announced government support for a 2027 Rugby World Cup bid.

References

External links
 France 2023 – official website 
 Ireland 2023 – official website

Bids
Sports competitions bids
Rugby union in France
Rugby union in Ireland
Rugby union in South Africa